Agi Mishol (born October 20, 1947) is an Israeli poet. Considered by many to be one of Israel's most prominent and popular poets, Mishol's work has been published in several languages, and has won various awards including the Zbigniew Herbert International Literary Award  and the Yehuda Amichai prize for literature.

Biography 
Agi (Agnes) Fried (later Mishol) was born in Cehu Silvaniei, Transylvania, Romania, to Hungarian-speaking Jewish parents who survived the Holocaust. She was brought to Israel at the age of 4. Her parents ran a bicycle and electronics repair shop in Gedera, a small southern town. The family spoke mainly Hungarian at home. They lived in a small, one-room apartment in a housing project. Until she was drafted into the Israel Defense Forces, Mishol slept on an armchair that opened into a bed. She began writing poetry at an early age, but did poorly in school. During her military service at the nuclear facility in Dimona, she began studying literature at Ben Gurion University of the Negev. She was married briefly at 19 and a half. After her divorce she moved to Jerusalem and did her BA and MA degrees in Hebrew literature at Hebrew University of Jerusalem, where she attended a writing workshop given by Yehuda Amichai. In Jerusalem she met and married Giora Mishol, who was working for the Ministry of Absorption. They moved to Kfar Mordechai, a Moshav next to her hometown Gedera, where they grow peaches, persimmons and pomegranates. They have two children, Maya and Uri, seven cats and a dog.

Mishol was an educator and Hebrew literature teacher at Be'er Tuvia high school during the years 1976 to 2001. After retiring, she served as a senior lecturer at Alma College for Hebrew Culture in Tel Aviv between the years 2002 and 2008. In 2006 she was the artistic director of the International Poetry Festival, held in Mishkenot Sha'ananim, Jerusalem. From 2011 to this date she leads the Helicon School of Poetry in Tel Aviv, where she also leads creative writing workshops. Mishol has lectured and taught creative writing at Ben Gurion University, Tel Aviv University, and the Hebrew University in Jerusalem where she also served as Poet-in-Residence (2007).

In 2018 Mishol's personal literary archive, including manuscripts, drafts, photographs, letters and diaries was moved to the National Library of Israel in Jerusalem.

Literary career 
Mishol is the author of 16 volumes of poetry. She self-published her first book, "Kodem Tafasti Rega," when she was 18 years old, but then recollected all copies in the bookshops and destroyed them. Her latest published book is "Mal'ach Hacheder" (Domestic Angel, Hakibutz Hameuhad).  Her volume "Selected and New Poems" (2003, Hakibutz Hameuhad and Bialik Institute) has sold over 13,000 copies to this date. Mishol's poems have been set to music by various Israeli artists including Corinne Allal, Yehudit Ravitz and Ori Leshman, and adapted into theatrical works such as "Yanshufot" (Owls, 2004).

Themes
According to Haim Gouri, Agi Mishol has a broad poetic spectrum: "All flora and fauna near and far, varied and colorful landscapes, love and romance, powerful eroticism, revealing and concealing, being the only child of Holocaust survivors who personally experienced the worse...It is poetry filled with rich metaphors and ongoing observation of the human condition."

In his introduction to "Selected and New Poems", Prof. Dan Miron wrote: "Agi Mishol is a poet now standing at the height of her strength... Agi Mishol undoubtedly belongs to the great dynasty of female Hebrew poets – Rachel Bluwstein, Yocheved Bat-Miriam, Lea Goldberg, Dalia Rabikovitch and Yona Wallach.

In his book review in The New York Times of Look There (2006), Joel Brouwer wrote: "Mishol... takes up political subjects with a sly delicacy reminiscent of the Polish poet Wislawa Szymborska's best work".

According to Amos Oz, "Agi Mishol's poems know how to tell a tale, to sing a song and also dance – all at one and the same time. I love the splendid surprises in them, the subtle and exact sadness, and the mysterious manner by which she makes this sadness overflow with hidden joy."

In 2006 Naomi Shihab Nye wrote: "Agi Mishol's poems feel perfectly weighted. Her mix of honest empathy and care and elegant wit is deeply touching and enlivening."

Awards and recognition
 In 2020 Mishol joined the Israel Institute for Advanced Studies as an Artist in Residence. 
 In March 2019 Mishol was awarded the Zbigniew Herbert International Literary Award. Members of award jury included Yuri Andrukhovych (Ukraine), Edward Hirsch (USA), Michael Krüger (Germany), Mercedes Montana (Spain), and Tomasz Różycki (Poland).
 In 2018 Mishol won the Newman Prize for life Achievement in the field of literature. 
 In 2018 Mishol received a (third) honorary doctorate, from Bar Ilan University, "for her lyrical poetry, which reveals the story of Israel and its people from her personal perspective as the child of Holocaust survivors".
 In 2017 Mishol's personal literary archive was deposited in the National Library of Israel.
 In 2016, Mishol received a (second) PHD Honoris Causa from the Weizmann Institute of Science. According to Weizmann Institute's website, "Her writing forges a rare balance between literal and poetic precision and accessibility to the readers, combining everyday language and slang with inventive linguistics. Infused with irony and humor, hers are very personal poems, which, at the same time, provide extensive human insight.". 
 In 2014 Mishol received the Italian , previously awarded to Seamus Heaney, Adunis and Yevgeny Yevtushenko. 
 In 2014 Mishol was awarded an honorary doctorate (Doctor Philosophiae Honoris Causa) by Tel Aviv University, "in recognition of her standing as one of Israel's most prominent and best-loved poets [and] her immense contribution to enriching Israeli culture".
 In 2007 Mishol received the Dolitsky prize for literature.
 In 2002 Mishol received the Yehuda Amichai Prize.
 In 2000 Mishol won the Kugel literary award.
 In 1995 Mishol won the Israeli Prime Minister Prize.

Published works in Hebrew 
 Domestic Angel, Mossad Bialik & Hakibbutz Hameuchad, 2015 [Mal'ach Hacheder]
 Awake, Hakibbutz Hameuhad, 2013 [Era]
 Working Order, Hakibbutz Hameuhad, 2011 [Sidur Avoda]
 House Call, Hakibbutz Hameuhad, 2009 [Bikur Bait]
 Things Happen, Hakibbutz Hameuhad & Mossad Bialik, 2005 [Korim Dvarim]
 Moment, Hakibbutz Hameuchad, 2005
 Selected and New Poems, Mossad Bialik & Hakibbutz Hameuchad, 2003 [Mivchar Ve-Chadashim]
 Wax Flower, Even Hoshen, 2002 [Nerot Netz Ha-Chalav]
 Dream Notebook, Even Hoshen, 2000 [Machberet Ha-Chalomot]
 Look There, Helikon-Tag, 1999 [Re'eh Sham]
 See (edited by Nathan Zach), Helikon-Tag, 1997 [Hineh] 
 The Interior Plain, Hakibbutz Hameuchad, 1995 [Ha-Shfela Ha-Pnimit]
 Fax Pigeon, Hakibbutz Hameuchad, 1991 [Yonat Faximilia]
 Plantation Notes, Keter, 19877 [Yoman Mata]
 Gallop, Hakibbutz Hameuchad, 1980 [Gallop] 
 A Cat's Scratch, Hakibbutz Hameuchad, 1978 [Srita Shel Hatul] 
 Nanny and Both of Us, Ekked, 1972 [Nanny Ve-Shneinu] 
 I Caught a Moment, Golan, 1967 [Kodem Tafasti Rega]

Translations
 Jestem stąd, 2020, 
 Čipka na železu, (translated by Klemen Jelinčič Boeta), Beletrina, 2018
 Ricami su ferro (translated by Anna Linda Callow & Kozimo Coen), Giuntina, 2017, 
 Less Like a Dove (translated by Joanna Chen), Shearsman Books, 2016, 
 Ropa Tendida (Agui Mishol), Poesía Mayor/leviatán, 2013, 
 , 2011, Interview and translations to Polish
 The ECCO Anthology of International Poetry, edited by Ilya Kaminsky and Susan Harris, 2010, ECCO
 Journal du verger (translated by Emmanuel Moses & Esther Orner), Caractères, 2008, 
 Şeherezada (translated by Riri Sylvia Manor & Ioana Ieronim), Institutul Cultural Român, 2008, 
 Look There: New and Selected Poems of Agi Mishol (translated by Lisa Katz), Graywolf Press, 2006, 
 The Swimmers, Poetry Ireland and the Tyrone Guthrie Centre, 1998,

References

External links 
 Profile by Poetry International Rotterdam
 Agi Mishol: Čipka na železu - Review and profile in Slovenian
 Israeli poet Agi Mishol avoids rallying for political causes, Al-Monitor
 Poet Agi Mishol is surprised she became hot stuff, Haaretz
 Agi Mishol drifts towards an Archimedes moment by Vivian Eden, Haaretz
 Music From Her Own Mind, A review of Agi Mishol's work
 Interview with Agi Mishol
 Hononrary Doctorate by Tel Aviv University – full text
 Előbb van a zene, aztán a hangszerek” interview with Agi Mishol by Szánto Gábor, "Szombat", 3 july 2008 (Hungarian)

1946 births
Living people
People from Cehu Silvaniei
Israeli poets
Israeli women poets
Ben-Gurion University of the Negev alumni
Israeli Jews
Israeli people of Hungarian-Jewish descent
Israeli people of Romanian-Jewish descent
Hungarian emigrants to Israel
Romanian emigrants to Israel
Jewish women writers